Jesús Alberto Ocejo Zazueta (born 16 June 1998) is a Mexican professional footballer who plays as a forward for Liga MX club Atlas, on loan from Santos Laguna.

Career statistics

Club

References

External links
 
 
 

Living people
1998 births
Association football forwards
Santos Laguna footballers
Tampico Madero F.C. footballers
Ascenso MX players
Liga MX players
Footballers from Sonora
Sportspeople from Hermosillo
21st-century Mexican people
Mexican footballers